Astrocast is a Swiss satellite communications company based in Lausanne. It aims to establish a global satellite network for IoT applications.

Astrocast was founded in 2014 by EPFL alumni, and employed 70 people in 2021. It launched its first five satellites in December 2018 aboard a SpaceX Falcon 9 rocket, and another five in June 2021. It aims to operate a full network of 100 satellites by 2024. Astrocast's nanosatellites are CubeSats, cubes  large. 

Astrocast is backed by venture capital firm Adit Ventures, Airbus SE's venture arm and the European Space Agency.

In June 2022, Astrocast announced that it was acquiring Hiber, an Amsterdam-based IoT space tech company.

Satellites launched 
As of January 2023 the company has launched four batches of satellites, for a total of 18 spacecraft currently in orbit around the Earth.

External links 

 Official website

References 

Aerospace companies of Switzerland
Communications satellite operators
Companies based in the canton of Vaud
2014 establishments in Switzerland
CubeSats